The Polish basketball champions, are the winners of the highest level of basketball in Poland, which is the Polish Basketball League (PLK). This page is a list of winners and runners-up in each given PLK season, along with additional information.

Śląsk Wrocław has won a total number of 17 titles, the highest of any club.

List

Polish Basketball League (1997–present)

References

Polish Basketball League
Polish